EWIP may refer to:

 The East–West Interconnector Project, a high-voltage electricity connection between Britain and Ireland
 The East Williamsburg Industrial Park, Brooklyn
 Exceptional Women in Publishing, a nonprofit organization